Thomas Hogue (5 October 1877 – 6 May 1956) was an Australian cricketer. He played seventeen first-class matches for New South Wales and Western Australia between 1901/02 and 1912/13.

References

External links
 

1877 births
1956 deaths
Australian cricketers
New South Wales cricketers
Western Australia cricketers
Cricketers from Newcastle, New South Wales